Acacia ausfeldii, commonly known as Ausfeld's wattle or whipstick cinnamon wattle, is a shrub species that is endemic to south-eastern Australia. It grows to between 1 and 4 metres high and has phyllodes that are 2 to 7 cm long and 2 to 6 mm wide. The yellow globular flowerheads appear in groups of two or three in the axils of the phyllodes in August to October, followed by straight seed pods which are 4 to 9 cm long and 2 to 4 mm wide.

The species was first formally described in 1867 by German botanist Eduard August von Regel based on a horticultural specimen grown from seed collected by J.G. Ausfeld in Bendigo, Victoria.

Plants thought to be hybrids between this species and Acacia paradoxa have been recorded in Victoria.

References

ausfeldii
Flora of New South Wales
Flora of Victoria (Australia)
Fabales of Australia
Plants described in 1867